Mitchell  "Mitch" Golby (born 3 October 1991) is a former professional Australian rules footballer who played for the Brisbane Lions in the Australian Football League (AFL). He was drafted by the Brisbane Lions with their first selection and sixteenth overall in the 2010 rookie draft, after having played for Gippsland Power in the TAC Cup. He looked almost certain to represent Victoria Country in the 2009 AFL Under 18 Championships but tore his ACL in a trial match.

Golby made his debut in the sixty-one point loss against  at Etihad Stadium in round 12, 2011. In his sixteenth match, he recorded twenty-four disposals, eight marks and four tackles in the ninety-two point win against  at the Gabba in round 8, 2012, and he was rewarded with the round nomination for the Rising Star. He played a total of 56 games between 2011 and 2015. In his final season in 2015, he managed only five matches, and was subsequently delisted.

References

External links

1991 births
Living people
Brisbane Lions players
Gippsland Power players
Port Melbourne Football Club players
Australian people of English descent
Australian rules footballers from Victoria (Australia)